2MASS J15404341−5101357 (abbreviated 2M1540) is a red dwarf of spectral type M7, located in  Norma at approximately 17 light-years from Earth. It is the nearest known M7 dwarf.

Discovery
Its discovery was announced in 2014 by Kirkpatrick et al. and independently by Pérez Garrido et al.

Kirkpatrick and colleagues found a few thousand new high proper motion objects under the AllWISE program of study of images, taken by Wide-field Infrared Survey Explorer (WISE). 2M1540 was one of these high proper motion objects. They named it WISEA J154045.67-510139.3 and assigned it spectral type M6.

Pérez Garrido and colleagues were looking for high proper motion sources in the 2MASS–WISE cross-match. They named it 2MASS J154043.42-510135.7 (2M1540 for short) and classified it as an M7.0±0.5 dwarf.

Since the trigonometric distance of 2M1540 agreed with its spectrophotometric distances, computed for a single object, it was concluded that it is not an equal-mass binary.

References

Local Bubble
M-type main-sequence stars
J15404341-5101357
WISE objects
Norma (constellation)
20140521